The Bautek Bico, also called the BiCo, is a German high-wing, two-place, hang glider designed and produced by Bautek.

Design and development
The Bico was designed for dual instruction and as such it features easy handling and optional wheeled landing gear.

The aircraft is made from aluminum tubing, with the wing top surface covered in 205 gram Power LL polyester and the bottom surface plain polyester sailcloth. Its  span wing is cable braced from a single tube-type kingpost. The wing's nose angle is 132°.

The wing is used on the PowerTrike Light-Delta nanotrike.

Specifications (Bico)

References

External links
Official website (German language)

Hang gliders